Sriraman is a village in the Andimadam taluk of Ariyalur district, Tamil Nadu, India.

Demographics 

 census, Sriraman had a total population of 1431 with 716 males and 715 females.

References 

Villages in Ariyalur district